was a village located in Miyoshi District, Tokushima Prefecture, Japan.

As of 2003, the village had an estimated population of 1,840 and a density of 17.35 persons per km². The total area was 106.06 km².

On March 1, 2006, Nishiiyayama, along with the towns of Ikawa, Ikeda, Mino and Yamashiro, and the village of Higashiiyayama (all from Miyoshi District), was merged to create the city of Miyoshi.

External links

 

Dissolved municipalities of Tokushima Prefecture
Miyoshi, Tokushima